'10' is the 9th studio album, and 10th overall release by the Rock band Enuff Z'Nuff. By fans, it is sometimes seen as the poppier counterpart to their harder sounding Paraphernalia record, as both albums were recorded and released during a similar time frame. The album cover art for '10' is a direct reference to the band's debut album, released a decade earlier. While the original U.S. edition of the album included a video for the single "There Goes My Heart" in QuickTime format, '10' was released first in Japan through the Pony Canyon label. The band also toured Japan in 2000 in support of the CD, which peaked at #60 on the Japanese music charts. The song "There Goes My Heart" was later featured in a trailer for the 2008 film The Promotion.

Track listing

Japanese Track List 

^ - Originally Released on US "Paraphernalia" (1999) but now featuring different lyrics and Chip Z'Nuff on vocals.

Personnel
Donnie Vie – lead vocals, guitars and keyboards
Chip Z'Nuff – bass guitar, guitars and vocals
Johnny Monaco – lead guitar
Ricky Parent – drums

Liner Notes
Produced By : Chip and Donnie 
Mixed By : Chris Shepard 
Additional Mixing By : Doug McBride, Johnny K, Bill Douglas
Recorded At : Star Trax, Groove Master, Velvet Shirts Studios, Gravity Studios 
Additional Guitars : Billy Corgan, French, and Derek Frigo

References 

Enuff Z'nuff albums
2000 albums
Spitfire Records albums